Alexandre Astier (born 16 June 1974) is a French writer, director, editor, scriptwriter, humorist, actor and composer.

Astier is most known as the creator, director, writer, editor, composer, and lead actor of the French television series Kaamelott, in which he also plays King Arthur.

Life and career

Alexandre Astier was born in Lyon on June 16, 1974, to Joëlle Sevilla and Lionnel Astier, both actors and producers mostly in Lyon's theatre scene.

Alexandre Astier studied music at the conservatory and at the American School of Modern Music of Paris. He also studied acting and screenwriting.

Four of Astier's seven children have featured in Kaamelott, and both his parents are main characters in the series. His daughters Ariane and Jeanne Astier play respectively Mehben and Mehgan, the daughters of Karadoc and Maevanwi (in the episodes Pupi and Exiles). His son Neil (who also appears as Karadoc and Mevanwi's son in Pupi) plays young Arthur in the season Book V, and in the final scene of Book VI. His son Ethan plays Arthur's dream heir in Book V. Moreover, the mother of his first five children, Anne-Gaëlle Daval, is head of the costume designs on Kaamelott and the short film Dies Irae.

In 2012, he plays Johann Sebastian Bach in his humorous show "Que ma joie demeure !" at the theater.

In 2014, his comic show "L'Exoconférence" begins at the theater in September.

Debut at the theatre

Alexandre Astier first got attention from the Lyon's public thanks to the play Le Jour du froment. He also acted in Nous crions grâce, a play written and directed by Jacques Chambon, to whom he gave the role of Merlin in Kaamelott.

Cinema
In 2001, he was the co-screenwriter and the songwriter of the short movies Soyons sport and Un soupçon fondé sur quelque chose de gras.

In 2002 he was the director of Dies Irae, a 14-minute short movie that is also the first draft of the Kaamelott TV show.

In 2006, he featured in Hey Good Looking!, a French movie by Lisa Azuelos. The same year, he appeared in Asterix at the Olympic Games by Frédéric Forestier and Thomas Langmann, and in Home Sweet Home by Didier Le Pêcheur.

In 2009, he played the role of the ex-husband of Sophie Marceau in the comedy LOL (Laughing Out Loud).

In 2014, he was the co-director and the screenwriter of Asterix: The Mansions of the Gods.

In 2015, he appeared in the film All Three of Us, directed by Kheiron.

In 2018, he wrote an original screenplay for a new Asterix movie: Asterix: The Secret of the Magic Potion. Like Asterix: The Mansions of the Gods, he co-directed it with Louis Clichy.

Kaamelott
Alexandre Astier became famous as the writer, director and actor in the TV show he produced. Kaamelott is inspired by the story of King Arthur and the Knights of the Round Table.
This humorous series is broadcast on the French channel M6. The episodes lasted three and a half minutes until 2007. Then, the format changed to seven minutes and finally reached fifty-five minutes per episode in the last season Book VI.

He also composes the music of the series.

He has the ambition to extend the TV show to the cinema as a trilogy, but not before 2012, since Alexandre Astier plans to work as a director on another movie before launching Kaamelott on the big screen.

In June 2010, invited on the set of the show "J'irai LOLer sur vos tombes", he unveiled his project to publish a series of graphic novels titled Kaamelott Resistance as a transition between the TV format and the future cinema films.

Filmography

Film

Television

Video games

See also
 Kaamelott

References

External links

 

1974 births
Living people
Mass media people from Lyon
French male television actors
French television directors
French male film actors
French film directors
French male screenwriters
French screenwriters
20th-century French dramatists and playwrights
21st-century French dramatists and playwrights
20th-century French male writers
French people of Spanish descent
21st-century French male writers
Officiers of the Ordre des Arts et des Lettres